Puntius euspilurus is a species of barbs native to the Mananthavady River in Kerala, India.

References

euspilurus
Taxa named by Mathews Plamoottil
Fish described in 2016